Turlock Transit is the primary bus agency serving residents and visitors to Turlock, the second-largest city in Stanislaus County, California (after the county seat, Modesto). It is operated by the city through its contractor Storer Transit Systems and offers both fixed routes and dial-a-ride local service within Turlock, with most fixed routes operating out of a central transit center. (Regional bus service connecting Turlock to other cities is operated by Stanislaus Regional Transit Authority).

History
Fixed route public transportation in Turlock was initiated on November 16, 1998; the city's new service was named the Bus Line Service of Turlock, aka BLaST. The initial BLaST service operated two loop routes, adding a third in May 1999. In addition, Turlock operated a dial-a-ride service under the name Dial-A-Ride-Turlock (DART). Laidlaw Transit was the initial contracted operator. The BLaST Transfer Hub was moved from the city's Walmart (on Countryside Drive) to Central Park near downtown Turlock on December 22, 2003.

By 2004, BLaST was operating four fixed routes, which all met at Central Park every 40 minutes. Routes were designated by letter (A, B, C, D) and operated as one-way loops; the transfer hub was moved to Dels Lane on August 13, 2007. With the move, headways were decreased to 30 minutes, but these were later adjusted to 35, then 40 minutes by 2011, coincident with fare increases and service hour cutbacks. The Turlock Regional Transit Center opened at its present location, the intersection of Golden State Boulevard and Dels Lane, on August 27, 2012. Both StaRT and The Bus (Merced) have scheduled service to the Transit Center, where riders may transfer to and from BLaST.

In accordance with the recommendations of the 2016 Short Range Transit Plan (SRTP), buses were fitted with electronic fare boxes and the service was expanded to six routes in June 2016. On January 2, 2017, the service was rebranded to Turlock Transit; the change included increased service hours and revised routes, in response to a state-mandated increase in the farebox recovery ratio target. In February 2017, a fire disabled four city-owned buses while they were parked at the city's corporation yard. Three were damaged beyond repair and were replaced in 2018.

Services

Fixed routes
All fixed routes start and end at the Roger K. Fall Transit Center in Turlock. Routes 1 and 2 operate the same path in opposite directions.

Fleet and facilities

Facilities

The Roger K. Fall Transit Center is at 1418 N Golden State Blvd near downtown Turlock, equipped with bus bays, rider waiting areas, and administrative offices. It was rededicated on September 21, 2018 for the longtime city transportation engineering supervisor; before it was renamed in 2018, it was the Turlock Regional Transit Center.

In 2019, Turlock Transit began planning the construction of the Transit Operations Facility, which will be located north of the existing city Corporation Yard. In accordance with planned future operations, the TOF will be equipped with solar power and battery-electric bus charging infrastructure.

References

External links

Official website

Public transportation in the San Joaquin Valley Area
Bus transportation in California
Public transportation in Stanislaus County, California
Transit agencies in California